Second law may refer to:

 The second of Newton's laws of motion
 Second law of thermodynamics
 The 2nd Law, a music album by the English rock band Muse
 Mendel's second law of independent assortment
 Second Law, or in Greek Deuterosis, the Mishnah, which comes after the Law of Moses

See also
Three Laws of Robotics